The 1973 World Sportscar Championship season was the 21st season of FIA World Sportscar Championship motor racing. It featured the 1973 World Championship for Makes and the 1973 Cup for GT Cars which were contested concurrently over a ten race series. The World Championship for Makes, which was open to Group 5 Sports Cars and Group 4 GT Cars, was won by Matra and the Cup for GT Cars, which was open only to Group 4 GT Cars, was won by Porsche.

Schedule

The following races counted towards the 1973 World Championship for Makes and the 1973 Cup for GT Cars.

† - No GT entries were received for the Österreichring event.
The Buenos Aires 1000 km, scheduled to be held on 21 October, was canceled six weeks after the running of the Watkins Glen 6 Hours.

Results

Races

World Championship for Makes

Championship points were awarded to the top 10 finishers in the order of 20-15-12-10-8-6-4-3-2-1 but only for the highest placed car of each make. The 7 best results were retained  for each make. Discarded points are shown in the above table within brackets.

Cup for GT Cars

No GT entries were received for Round 9.

The cars
The following models contributed to the nett pointscores of their respective makes.

World Championship for Makes
 Matra Simca MS670 & Matra Simca MS670B
 Ferrari 365 GTB/4 Daytona & Ferrari 312PB
 Porsche 911 Carrera RSR & Porsche 908/3
 Mirage M6 Ford Cosworth
 Lola T282 Ford Cosworth & Lola T290 Ford Cosworth
 Chevron B21 Ford Cosworth & Chevron B23 Ford Cosworth
 Alfa Romeo 33TT3 & Alfa Romeo Giulia GTAm
 Lancia Stratos
 Chevrolet Corvette
 Ligier JS2 Maserati

Cup for GT Cars
 Porsche 911S & Porsche 911 Carrera RSR
 Ferrari 365 GTB/4 Daytona
 Chevrolet Corvette
 Alfa Romeo Giulia GTAm

References

External links
 World Championship 1973, wspr-racing.com, as archived at web.archive.org
 The Ferrari vs Matra combat for the WCM, www.imca-slotracing.com, as archived at web.archive.org

World Sportscar Championship seasons
World Sportscar